Tranemo Municipality (Tranemo kommun) is a municipality in Västra Götaland County in western Sweden. Its seat is located in the town of Tranemo.

There are twelve original municipal units (as of 1863) in the area. The municipal reform of 1952 created four larger entities. The next reform was implemented in two steps with amalgamations taking place in 1967 and 1974, leading to the present municipality.

The name comes from the bird Trana, which means crane.

The coat of arms, granted in 1975, show a crane with a glass blowing belge. Glass blowing is an old industry in the municipality, with the first glass blower established in 1741.

Localities
Localities in Tranemo Municipality with population numbers from 2004-06:
Tranemo 	3,205 
Limmared 	1,445
Länghem 	1,178
Dalstorp 	824
Grimsås 	779
Ambjörnarp 	310
Ljungsarp 	274
Uddebo 	263
Sjötofta 	239
Nittorp 	211

References

External links

Tranemo Municipality - Official site

Municipalities of Västra Götaland County
South Älvsborg